The New Zealand Ice Hockey Federation (NZIHF) is the governing body of ice hockey in New Zealand.

Member Associations
Auckland Ice Hockey Association
Canterbury Ice Hockey Association
Southern Ice Hockey League
Mackenzie Ice Hockey Association
Queenstown Ice Hockey Association
Alexandra Flames Ice Hockey Association
Dunedin Ice Hockey Association
Gore Grizzlies Ice Hockey Association

Affiliate members
Wellington Ice Hockey Association

Competitions
The NZIHF organises both the New Zealand National Ice Hockey Championships and the New Zealand Ice Hockey League.

The NZIHF also competes internationally in various grades of the  IIHF World Ice Hockey Championship.

References

External links

Associations
New Zealand Ice Hockey Federation Website
Auckland Ice Hockey Association
Canterbury Ice Hockey Association
Dunedin Ice Hockey Association

Ice hockey in New Zealand
International Ice Hockey Federation members
Ice hockey